Stavanger Idrettsforening (SIF) was founded in 1905. SIF became an alliance club in 1998, and has divisions for association football, boxing, handball and track and field athletics.

Football

Stavanger IF Fotball is the football division of SIF. Before World War II, it played several seasons of top-tier football, and on several occasions reached the semi finals of the Norwegian Cup. In 2003, the club played in the Fifth Division, but reached the second tier Adeccoligaen in 2009. However, after several consecutive relegations, it as of 2013 plays in the Fourth Division.

The team is located in Bekkefaret/Schancheholen in Stavanger and plays its home matches at SIF Stadion.

Handball
SIF's handball division is located in Stavanger Idrettshall.

References

External links
SIF Håndball

Norwegian handball clubs
Sport in Stavanger
1905 establishments in Norway
Athletics clubs in Norway
Multi-sport clubs in Norway